Live at Newport II was the third live recording released by the Toshiko Akiyoshi – Lew Tabackin Big Band and the second release of music from the band's performance at the 1977 Newport Jazz Festival (following Live at Newport '77).

It was reissued in 2006 on BMG Records.

Track listing
All songs composed and arranged by Toshiko Akiyoshi:
LP side A
"March of the Tadpoles" – 7:08
"Warning: Success May Be Hazardous To Your Health" – 6:35
"Road Time Shuffle" – 6:34
LP side B
"Minamata" (suite) – 19:56
 "Peaceful Village"
 "Prosperity & Consequence"
 "Epilogue"

Personnel
Toshiko Akiyoshi – piano
Lew Tabackin – tenor saxophone and flute
Gary Herbig – tenor saxophone
Gary Foster – alto saxophone
Dick Spencer – alto saxophone
Beverly Darke – baritone saxophone
Steven Huffsteter – trumpet
Bobby Shew – trumpet
Mike Price – trumpet
Richard Cooper – trumpet
Bill Reichenbach Jr. – trombone
Charlie Loper – trombone
Rick Culver – trombone
Phil Teele – bass trombone
Don Baldwin – bass
Peter Donald – drums

References

Toshiko Akiyoshi – Lew Tabackin Big Band albums
Albums recorded at the Newport Jazz Festival
1977 live albums
Baystate Records albums